Giovanni (Jean) de Sperati (14 October 1884 – 28 April 1957) was an Italian stamp forger. Robson Lowe considered him an artist and even professional stamp authenticators of his time attested to the genuineness of his work. Sperati created what he called a Livre d'Or which he boasted of in his autobiography and which contained 239 favourable opinions as to the genuineness of his forgeries from numerous experts, including Dr. Edward Diena and the Royal Philatelic Society London.

Early life
Sperati was born 1884 in Pistoia, Italy, though he spent a large part of his life in France where he adopted the name Jean. Sperati retained his Italian passport throughout his life and always considered himself an Italian. As a child in Pistoia and later in France, Sperati began to collect stamps. He was particularly interested in printing techniques, as well as photography which was in its infancy at that time. Relatives owned a postcard factory as well as a paper mill. Through this, Sperati was able to obtain copious knowledge of photographic processes, print technology and chemicals. These formed the basis for his eventual career as a stamp counterfeiter.

The first forgeries 

The first attempts to copy stamps went extraordinarily well. The first forgeries were of valuable stamps from San Marino, and stamp experts believed them to be real. Thereupon Sperati began to produce numerous further reproductions of valuable stamps from all over the world. This eventually resulted in well over 500 master-quality forgeries from more than 100 different stamp-issuing agencies.

In 1942, for the first time in his life, Sperati came into conflict with the law. A shipment marked as valuable from Sperati to a stamp dealer in Lisbon, Portugal, was intercepted by French customs. It contained several falsified German stamps. They charged him with "exporting capital" without a licence and trying to avoid customs payments. He protested his innocence, and explained to the police that it contained only copies of valuable stamps, which he himself had prepared, whereupon the police called in the country's best stamp experts to clear up the facts of the case. These experts came to the judgment that the stamps in question were all originals, and very valuable ones at that. Sperati still managed to convince the police that they were fakes, and was therefore charged with fraud. His trial took place in April 1948.

The 1948 trial
To explain, Sperati tried to convince the court that he had no deceitful intentions in the sale of the stamps. He considered himself to be an artist and not a counterfeiter. Furthermore, he declared to the court that he had merely forgotten to clearly mark the stamps as forgeries and he promised to be more diligent about such marking in the future. He claimed that he had offered the forgeries of rare stamps at about 1% of the normal market price in order to assist the simple collector to obtain these rarities. Nevertheless, the Parisian judiciary convicted Sperati and sentenced him to a year in prison, 10,000 francs fine and an additional 300,000 francs for criminal intentions. The Parisians' judiciary did not convict him on the basis of the imitation, but rather because of Sperati's "deceitful intentions". He was convicted in April 1948.

After the guilt verdict 
Sperati did not have to serve his prison sentence on the grounds of his age – he was already over 64 years old. In 1954 he sold all his remaining forgeries as well as all the clichés to the "British Philatelic Association."  He then withdrew from the forgery business and promised never again to falsify a stamp. His motive for selling the tools of his trade to the "British Philatelic Association" was to prevent them falling into the possession of someone who would imitate his work. Sperati died three years later in Aix-les-Bains at the age of 73.

His life's work
The stamp forgeries of Sperati are some of the best of the world. He created forgeries of the 10 cent black, one of the first United States postal issues, in 1847. It is possible to identify these forgeries by two small flaws. Many Sperati forgeries remain undetected. Sperati falsified the most valuable rarities of the stamp world. He did this with an inimitable precision. A Sperati forgery is far from worthless. They obtain high prices as special collectables. Sperati paid great attention to the accuracy of the postmark when falsifying the stamps. Therefore, postmarks found on his forgeries are limited to those of larger cities. Sperati's forgeries are currently valuable in the philatelic market. He probably produced more than 5,000 forgeries.

See also
Erasmo Oneglia
List of stamp forgers
Philatelic fakes and forgeries

References

Further reading 
Lowe, Robson. (1955) The Work of Jean de Sperati. London.
Tyler, Varro. E. (1976) Philatelic Forgers: Their Lives and Works. London: Robson Lowe.

External links

 Stampforgeries.com - Many Sperati forgeries compared to genuine stamps side-by-side
 Gnome Village page on Sperati
 Glen Stephens column on Sperati forgeries
 Klaseboer list of forgeries
 Article on Sperati from The Economist
 Sotheby's Auction: The Philatelic Collection formed by Sir Gawaine Baillie, Bt. Volume X: British Empire Part two and Sperati Forgeries of the World

1884 births
1957 deaths
Stamp forgers
Italian male criminals
People from Pistoia
People convicted of forgery